Robert Sand (born August 12, 1982) is an American lawyer and politician who has served as the 33rd Iowa State Auditor since 2019. He is a member of the Democratic Party. Sand was assistant attorney general of Iowa from 2010 to 2017. In 2018, he ran for state auditor, defeating Republican incumbent Mary Mosiman. After considering a run for governor of Iowa in 2022, Sand opted to run for reelection. Sand was reelected in 2022, becoming the only statewide elected Democrat in Iowa.

Early life
Sand is from Decorah, Iowa. His mother, Leslie, worked as a physical therapist while his father, Kevin, was a doctor. While he attended Decorah High School, he spent two years lobbying community leaders in Decorah to build a skate park. Sand graduated from Decorah High School in 2001.

Sand enrolled at Brown University, where he was awarded a Harry S. Truman Scholarship. While he was in college, he took a semester off to intern in the Washington, D.C., office of U.S. Senator Tom Harkin, a member of the Democratic Party from Iowa. He made his first political donation to Howard Dean's 2004 presidential campaign, but missed the Iowa caucus because he was modeling menswear in Milan. He also modeled in Paris. Sand graduated from Brown with a bachelor's degree in political science in 2005.

Sand enrolled at the University of Iowa College of Law. He earned his Juris Doctor in 2010. In law school, he was both president of the Iowa Student Bar Association and an editor-in-chief of a law journal. He caucused for Barack Obama' presidential campaign in 2008.

Career

Early career
In 2006, Sand worked as an aide for State Representative Ed Fallon's campaign for governor of Iowa. After Fallon lost the primary election, Sand became the campaign manager for Denise O'Brien, the Democratic Party's nominee for Iowa secretary of agriculture. While he was on the campaign trail, he met Tom J. Miller, the attorney general of Iowa. 

Miller appointed Sand assistant attorney general in September 2010. Upon joining the attorney general's office, he became the lead prosecutor for the Iowa Film Office tax credit scandal, in which millions of dollars of film tax credits were fraudulently obtained. After completing the Iowa Film Office case, Sand was recruited by Tom H. Miller, the deputy attorney general, to work in the Area Prosecutions Division, which focuses on prosecuting white-collar financial crimes. Sand prosecuted an investment advisor for deceiving people to invest into the International Bank of Meekamui, an international Ponzi scheme emanating from Papua New Guinea.

Sand also prosecuted the Hot Lotto fraud scandal, in which seven lottery tickets across five states were rigged, with the amount totaling $25 million. Eddie Tipton, the former information security director of the Multi-State Lottery Association, confessed to rigging a random number generator in the largest lottery rigging scheme in American history. Tipton was sentenced to 25 years in prison in 2017. After completing the prosecution, Sand resigned from the Attorney General's office so that he could run for office.

State auditor
In the 2018 elections, Sand ran for Iowa State Auditor. He was not opposed in the Democratic Party primary election. Sand defeated Republican Mary Mosiman, the incumbent, in the general election 51% to 46%, while Libertarian Fred Perryman received 3% of the vote. He became the second Democrat elected into that position in over a century.

Sand was sworn into office on January 2, 2019. At his swearing-in ceremony, he announced that he would have a balanced leadership team, with his top three assistants being a Democrat, a Republican, and an independent. As state auditor, Sand developed the Public Innovations and Efficiencies (PIE) program, which awards fiscal efficiency in government. The PIE program inspired Shad White, the Republican state auditor of Mississippi, to develop a similar program. Prior to the 2020 presidential caucuses, Sand's endorsement was sought by multiple candidates. He did not endorse a candidate, though he did co-host a campaign event in Decorah with Cory Booker that he said did not constitute an endorsement.

An audit conducted by Sand's office in 2020 found that Governor Kim Reynolds misspent $21 million from the CARES Act on unrelated state contracts rather than on managing the COVID-19 pandemic. The state returned the money to their coronavirus relief fund. Sand alleged Reynolds broke Iowa's law against self-promotion by appearing in a taxpayer-funded video to promote wearing a mask. An Iowa ethics board later found Reynolds did not break any laws. In November 2021, Sand said Reynolds improperly used nearly $450,000 in federal coronavirus relief funds to pay salaries for 21 staff members for three months in the last year.

After considering a campaign for governor of Iowa against Reynolds, Sand announced in December 2021 that he would run for reelection in 2022. In January 2022, Mary Ann Hanusa, a Republican former state representative, announced that she would run for state auditor. Todd Halbur, a small business owner, defeated Hanusa in the primary election and Sand defeated Halbur in the November 8 general election with 50.1% of the vote.

Personal life
Sand and his wife, Christine (née Lauridsen), met in Des Moines and married in Madison County on June 2, 2012. They have two children.

Sand wrote The Winning Ticket: Uncovering America's Biggest Lottery Scam, a book about the Hot Lotto scandal, with Reid Forgrave, a reporter for The Des Moines Register. The book was published on May 1, 2022.

Electoral history

Bibliography

See also
List of Truman Scholars

References

External links

Government website
Campaign website

1982 births
Brown University alumni
Iowa Democrats
Iowa lawyers
Living people
Male models from Iowa
People from Decorah, Iowa
21st-century American lawyers
21st-century American politicians
State Auditors of Iowa
University of Iowa College of Law alumni